Salo is a surname. Notable people with the surname include:

Dave Salo, American swim team head coach
David Salo (born 1969), American linguist
Eero Salo (1921-1975), Finnish politician
Elaine Salo (1962–2016), South African anthropologist and academic
Elina Salo (born 1936), Finnish actress
Mika Salo (born 1966), Finnish racing driver
Ola Salo (born 1977), Swedish singer
Sami Salo (born 1974), Finnish ice hockey player
Toivo Salo (1909-1981), Finnish chess player
Tommy Salo (born 1971), Swedish ice hockey player

Finnish-language surnames
Surnames of Finnish origin